Hayley Carline (born 22 November 1985), better known as Ava Leigh, is an English reggae singer from Chester, England.

Career
Leigh's career first began when she started performing with her school's jazz band. In her "mid teens" she acquired a manager, and tried out for a variety of labels, singing R&B. However, Leigh realised that the genre "never, ever worked" for her. Leigh, in an interview with The Telegraph, attributed her mother for first getting her into reggae: "How I got into reggae ... was from my mother listening to it. She was a big fan of [the British reggae subgenre] Lover's Rock. When I was about nine or 10, I remember hearing "Silly Games" by Janet Kay, with all those high notes, and thinking, "Hmm, I wonder if I can do that?"

In 2008, Leigh stated that she hoped to become part of a musical movement bringing singers (as opposed to dancehall deejays) back to the forefront in reggae. As she told noted writer Pete Lewis of Blues & Soul: I think the reason we're now living in the decade of dancehall deejays is because everyone these days is so into hip hop and rap, and dancehall is basically the reggae version of that. But hopefully me doing this can help signal the start of many more successful new reggae vocalists to come."

Leigh worked with writers such as Nick Manasseh, Future Cut and Feng Shui on her debut album, originally to be titled Turned on Underground. Partly recorded at Harry J's in Jamaica, the album was reviewed favourably and was described as having the "slick appeal of a US R&B princess." The album was released as a Promo CD titled Rollin but never received a full release after the singles "La La La" and "Mad About the Boy" did not achieve commercial success. Leigh released a four-track extended play (EP) of recordings from the album titled La La La, on 5 January 2009.

Leigh's song "Mad About the Boy" was featured on the film Angus, Thongs and Perfect Snogging, and her version of "Mas Que Nada" was featured in a 2008 TV commercial for chain store Next's summer clothing range. In 2008, Leigh co-wrote Joss Stone's digital download single "Governmentalist", featuring Nas.

Discography

Studio albums
''Rollin (unreleased; full album promo available 2008)

Extended playsiTunes Live: London Festival '08 (2008)La La La (2009)

Singles
{| class="wikitable"
!Year
!Single
!UK chartposition
!Album
|-
|2007
|"La La La"
|align="center"|—
|rowspan="2"|Rollin|-
|2008
|"Mad About the Boy" [A]
|align="center"|128
|-
|}

Notes
A ^''' Released as a double-A side single with "Mas Que Nada" in some retailers.

References

External links

1985 births
Living people
Reggae fusion artists
English women singer-songwriters
21st-century English women singers
21st-century English singers